Threnody is a song, hymn or poem of mourning composed or performed as a memorial to a dead person.

Threnody may also refer to:
 Threnody (comics), a fictional character created by Marvel Comics for the X-Men series
 Threnody (Engel album), 2010
 Threnody (Frida song), 1982 single
 Threnody (short), a 2002 short dance-film reflection on September 11 by Vincent Paterson
 Threnody (Woe of Tyrants album), 2010
 Threnody Ensemble, an experimental classical music group
 Threnody to the Victims of Hiroshima, a 1960 musical composition by Krzysztof Penderecki 
 a poem by Ralph Waldo Emerson
 the setting of Brandon Sanderson's novella "Shadows for Silence in the Forests of Hell"